Do Shakh (also Romanized as Do Shākh) is a village in Rostaq Rural District, Rostaq District, Darab County, Fars Province, Iran. At the 2006 census, its population was 45, in 9 families. Do Shakh is famous for being the sitze of a Roman tomb, thought to be built by Roman prisoners of war between 280 and 290.

References 

Populated places in Darab County